The 1979 San Diego mayoral election was held on September 18, 1979 to elect the mayor for San Diego. Incumbent Pete Wilson stood for reelection for a third term. As the result of a voter-approved amendment to the City Charter to align mayoral elections with state elections, the winner of the election stood to receive an extended five-year term.

Municipal elections in California are officially non-partisan, though some candidates do receive funding and support from various political parties. The non-partisan primary was held September 18, 1979. Wilson received a majority of the votes in the primary and was reelected mayor with no need for a runoff election.

Candidates
Pete Wilson, Mayor of San Diego
Simon Casady, former newspaper publisher
John Kelley, businessman and perennial candidate
Charlotte Buchanan, homemaker
Michael Gomez, high school counselor
Jerry Lester, pharmacist and minister
Raul Gonzalez

Campaign
On June 19, 1979, former newspaper publisher Simon Casady announced he would run for mayor of San Diego. Casady was considered the strongest challenger to Wilson's attempt at a third term. Although the position of mayor is officially non-partisan, Casady, a liberal Democrat and long-time activist, hoped to run a partisan campaign against Wilson. Wilson officially announced his candidacy for re-election on June 20, 1979. Wilson emphasized his positive record in his previous two terms as mayor in his re-election campaign.

On September 18, 1979, Wilson was re-elected easily with 61.6 percent of the vote. Casady came in second with 31.6 percent of the vote. The five remaining candidates garnered less than 7 percent vote combined. Because Wilson received a majority of the vote, he was reelected outright with no need for a runoff election.

Primary election results

General election
Because Wilson was elected mayor with a majority of the votes in the primary, no runoff election was held.

References

1979
1979 California elections
1979 United States mayoral elections
1979
September 1979 events in the United States